Kei Suma (4 September 1935 – 7 December 2013) was a Japanese film and television actor, whose career spanned 25 years.

Born on Kunashir Island under Japanese rule, Suma began his acting career in 1985. He was best known for his roles in A Class to Remember (1993) and Pretty Woman (2003).

Kei Suma died of liver cancer on 7 December 2013, aged 78, in Tokyo.

Filmography

Film
Final Take (1986) – Ogura
Hope and Pain (1988)

Television
Kenpō wa Madaka (1996) – Tokujiro Kanamori
Aoi Tokugawa Sandai (2000) – Date Masamune

References

External links

1935 births
2013 deaths
Actors from Hokkaido
People from Sakhalin Oblast
Japanese male television actors
Japanese male film actors
20th-century Japanese male actors
21st-century Japanese male actors
Deaths from liver cancer
Deaths from cancer in Japan